Bathylychnops exilis, the Javelin spookfish, is a species of barreleye found in the northern Pacific and in the eastern Atlantic Ocean near the Azores where it is found at depths of around .  This species grows to a length of  SL.

The species is notable for unusual protuberances that grow from its eyes, which each have "a well developed lens" and a retina, and which have led to the species being called a "four-eyed" fish. They have two spherical eyes that are dorsally directed and two secondary eyes that are ventrally directed. It has been suggested that the purpose of these extra eyes is detection of threats from below, since these eyes point downwards. The Javelin spookfish have a distinct and advantageous secondary globe to their eyes. They use mirrors to collect and focus light, instead of a lens to divert the path of light. This feature provides great benefits in their chances for survival.

References

Opisthoproctidae
Fish described in 1958